A foreword is a portion preceding the main body of a book.

Foreword may also refer to:
 Foreword (Crimson Lotus EP), by Finnish band Crimson Lotus
 Foreword (Moving Mountains EP), by New York band Moving Mountains
 Foreword (Tori Kelly EP), by American singer-songwriter Tori Kelly
 "Foreword", a song by American rapper Tyler, The Creator, on the 2017 album Flower Boy

See also
 Forward (disambiguation)